

Deaths
February 18 - Abdul Rashid Khan, 107, Hindustani musician
March 6 - Kalabhavan Mani, 45, actor and singer (liver cirrhosis and methyl alcohol poisoning)
November 22 - M. Balamuralikrishna, 86, Carnatic musician and composer
December 15 - Ajit Varman, 69, composer

References

India
Indian music
Music